The Black Rainbow is a 1916 Austro-Hungarian film directed by Michael Curtiz.

External links

1916 films
Films directed by Michael Curtiz
Austro-Hungarian films
Austrian black-and-white films
Hungarian black-and-white films
Austrian silent feature films
Hungarian silent feature films